This is the list of structural isomers of nonane. There are 35.

Straight chain
Nonane

Octanes
2-Methyloctane
3-Methyloctane
4-Methyloctane

Heptanes

Dimethylheptanes
2,2-Dimethylheptane
2,3-Dimethylheptane
2,4-Dimethylheptane
2,5-Dimethylheptane
2,6-Dimethylheptane
3,3-Dimethylheptane
3,4-Dimethylheptane
3,5-Dimethylheptane
4,4-Dimethylheptane

Ethylheptanes
3-Ethylheptane
4-Ethylheptane

Hexane
Isomers where hexane is the longest chain:

Trimethyl
2,2,3-Trimethylhexane
2,2,4-Trimethylhexane
2,2,5-Trimethylhexane
2,3,3-Trimethylhexane
2,3,4-Trimethylhexane
2,3,5-Trimethylhexane
2,4,4-Trimethylhexane
3,3,4-Trimethylhexane

Methyl+Ethyl
3-Ethyl-2-methylhexane
4-Ethyl-2-methylhexane
3-Ethyl-3-methylhexane
3-Ethyl-4-methylhexane

Pentane
Isomers where pentane is the longest chain

Tetramethyl
2,2,3,3-Tetramethylpentane
2,2,3,4-Tetramethylpentane
2,2,4,4-Tetramethylpentane
2,3,3,4-Tetramethylpentane

Dimethyl+ethyl
3-Ethyl-2,2-dimethylpentane
3-Ethyl-2,3-dimethylpentane
3-Ethyl-2,4-dimethylpentane

Diethyl
3,3-Diethylpentane

Lists of isomers of alkanes
Isomerism
Hydrocarbons